Kotelnikovo is a town and the administrative center of Kotelnikovsky District in Volgograd Oblast, Russia, located on the Kurmoyarsky Aksay River (which flows into the Tsimlyansk Reservoir),  southwest of Volgograd, the administrative center of the oblast. Population:

History

It was founded in 1897 as a settlement servicing the construction of a railway station of the same name (opened 1899). During World War II, it served as a base for the German troops of Field Marshal Erich von Manstein during the Battle of Stalingrad. A Soviet counteroffensive liberated Kotelnikovo on December 29, 1942. It was granted town status in 1955.

Kotelnikovo (air base), a Russian Air Force airbase is located nearby.

Administrative and municipal status
Within the framework of administrative divisions, Kotelnikovo serves as the administrative center of Kotelnikovsky District. As an administrative division, it is incorporated within Kotelnikovsky District as the town of district significance of Kotelnikovo. As a municipal division, the town of district significance of Kotelnikovo is incorporated within Kotelnikovsky Municipal District as Kotelnikovskoye Urban Settlement.

References

Notes

Sources

Cities and towns in Volgograd Oblast